The Alpine Ski Club (ASC) is a club of ski mountaineers based in the UK and the first ski mountaineering club in Great Britain.

Membership is open to experienced independent ski-mountaineers who fulfil the minimum entry qualification. Aspirant membership is open to those who do not meet the criteria.

Notable Members (Honorary and Ordinary) Past and Present 

 Sir Edmund Hillary
 Sir Chris Bonington
 Peter Lunn
 Frank Smythe
 Patrick Pery, 6th Earl of Limerick

History 

The ASC was created on Saturday the 7th of March 1908 at a dinner in the Devonshire Club hosted by Dr Henry Lunn (later to be Sir Henry Lunn). Founder members included:
 Sir Martin Conway (First President)
 Mr Arnold Lunn (later to be Sir Arnold Lunn)
 Mr William Moore
 Rev. Canon Savage
 Mr Rickmer Rickmers
 Dr Tom Longstaff
 Mr E. V. S Caulfeild
 George Ingle Finch

Stephen Venables became the patron of the Alpine Ski Club in 2017.

Activities 

The club provides a venue for active ski-mountaineers to meet, exchange information and to plan new expeditions. It holds two lecture meetings every year in autumn and spring, usually at The Alpine Club and an annual dinner is usually held in November.

In addition to these UK-based activities, the ASC also organises meetings in the Alps as well as expeditions to little-known mountain ranges across the world. Enterprising guideless ski expeditions in recent years have included ski-mountaineering expeditions to Muztag Ata, Zanskar, Kashmir, Gangotri, Iran,  Turkey and Svaneti. Recent Alpine meets have been in Pontresina, Andermatt, Briançon,  Dolomites, Tatras, Lyngen, Stubai and Romania.

Avalanche rescue transceivers are available for hire to members of the Alpine Ski Club. This is provided as part of the ASC's commitment to safer ski mountaineering.

Sponsorship and awards 

The Alpine Ski Club has two award schemes, namely the Kenneth Smith Scholarship and the Memorial Adventure Fund.

These schemes can provide help for:

 Taking part in a ski mountaineering expedition which includes an element of exploration, 
 Carrying out a research project on an aspect of ski mountaineering, 
 Attending an approved course in ski mountaineering, or 
 Other activities which further the knowledge and practice of safe movement in the mountains on ski.

The awards are especially, but not exclusively, for young skiers.

See also 

 Skiing
 Ski touring
 Ski mountaineering
 Telemark skiing

References

External links
 

Mountaineering in the Alps
Sports organizations established in 1908
Climbing organizations
Ski clubs
1908 establishments in the United Kingdom
Skiing in the Alps